Angelo Anquilletti (25 April 1943 – 9 January 2015) was an Italian football defender. A tough yet fair player, Anquiletti was a successful right-sided full-back, who was known for his strength, energy, work-rate, positioning, marking ability, anticipation, and his ability to read the game; he also excelled in the air and was confident on the ball and at distributing it to teammates, which also enabled him to be deployed as a sweeper towards the end of his career. He is mostly remembered for his lengthy spell with AC Milan and for being a member of the Italian UEFA Euro 1968 winning squad. Anquiletti was known by the fans as "Angelo Anguilla" (Angelo the Eel), due to his man-marking ability, and wore the number 2 shirt throughout his successful Milan career.

Club career
Anquiletti Started his career in Serie D with Solbiatese during the 1964–65 season. In 1964 he played with Atalanta in Serie A, making his debut on 16 November 1964, at the age of 21, in a 1–0 away win over Cagliari; he remained at the club for two seasons. From 1966 to 1977 played for AC Milan, where he achieved notable success, forming an impressive defensive line-up during his 11 seasons with the club alongside Cudicini, Trapattoni, Rosato, and Schnellinger, which was nicknamed the Maginot Line. He was notably part of their European Cup victory in 1969, also winning the 1967–68 Serie A title, two European Cup Winners' Cups (1967–68 and 1972–73), the 1969 Intercontinental Cup, and four Coppa Italia titles (1966–67, 1971–72, 1972–73, 1976–77). He notably scored two goals against Levski Sofia in the first leg of the first round of the victorious 1967–68 edition of the European Cup Winners' Cup. Overall, he made 418 appearances for Milan, and is the club's ninth all-time appearance holder; 278 of his appearances came in Serie A, 71 in the Coppa Italia, 63 in European Competitions, and 6 in other competitions. He ended his career with Monza, spending 2 more seasons in Serie B before retiring in 1979, at the age of 36.

Overall, he played 326 games in the Serie A for Atalanta and Milan, and 41 games in Serie B, although he was unable to score a goal in the Italian leagues throughout his career.

International career
Anquiletti earned 2 caps for the Italy national football team, and was part of Italy's UEFA Euro 1968 squad that won the tournament on home soil under Valcareggi, despite not making an appearance throughout the cup. He made his international debut in January 1969, in a friendly tournament in Mexico which preceded the 1970 FIFA World Cup, making his only two appearances for Italy against Mexico that year. He struggled to find space in the national side due to the presence of Tarcisio Burgnich and Fabrizio Poletti in his role.

Death
Anquiletti died on 9 January 2015, at the age of 71, after struggling with a long illness.

Career statistics

Club 

*European competitions include the UEFA Champions League, UEFA Cup Winners' Cup, UEFA Cup, and UEFA Super Cup

Honours
AC Milan
 Serie A: 1967–68
 Coppa Italia: 1966–67, 1971–72, 1972–73, 1976–77
 European Cup: 1968–69
 UEFA Cup Winners' Cup: 1967–68, 1972–73
 Intercontinental Cup: 1969

Italy
 UEFA European Football Championship: 1968 (on the roster, did not play any games).

Individual
 AC Milan Hall of Fame

References

External links
 

1943 births
2015 deaths
Italian footballers
Italy international footballers
Serie A players
Serie B players
Serie C players
Serie D players
Atalanta B.C. players
A.C. Milan players
A.C. Monza players
UEFA Euro 1968 players
UEFA European Championship-winning players
A.S.D. SolbiaSommese Calcio players
Association football defenders
UEFA Champions League winning players